Jacob Matthew Richardson (born February 20, 1985) is an American actor. He is perhaps best known for his roles in the film Honey, We Shrunk Ourselves and the series Fudge.

Career

Richardson landed his first acting role in 1995 at the age of nine on the ABC series Fudge, based on the stories of Judy Blume. Soon after, he appeared in the series The Nanny and as Blade in Problem Child 3: Junior in Love.

Though silent through 1996, Richardson soon starred in Walt Disney Pictures' 1997 classic Honey, We Shrunk Ourselves as Mitch. He played a minor role in the Disney film Toothless, alongside Kirstie Alley, Ross Malinger, and directed by Melanie Mayron. He appeared in the independent film "Little Cobras" as Derek. Though not having a big following, the movie was screened at the Cannes Film Festival.

Richardson starred as Reggie Van Dough in the 1998 Warner Home Video family comedy Richie Rich's Christmas Wish. He then made an appearance on the drama 7th Heaven as the troubled young boy, Johnny Morton.

In 2001, Richardson fulfilled one of his dreams of working with Kevin Smith, making a small cameo in Jay and Silent Bob Strike Back.

Throughout 2002, Richardson starred in many TV shows including NYPD Blue, Need You Know, and Boston Public. He also appeared in TV Movie Homeward Bound.

Richardson also starred in the 2002 movie, The Dangerous Lives of Altar Boys, produced by Jodie Foster.

The 2003 movie Hangman's Curse, based on a Christian novel by Frank Peretti, Richardson plays the gothic character of Ian Snyder. He starred in many TV shows before working again with Kevin Smith in the 2006 hit Clerks II. Shortly after, Richardson starred in the TV series Cold Case as troubled teen Trevor Dawson.

Personal life

He was born in Van Nuys, California, the son of Tim and Chris Richardson.

Awards

 1996 Young Artist Award: Nomination for Best Performance by a Young ActorTV Comedy Series for Fudge.

Filmography

References

External links
 

1985 births
20th-century American male actors
21st-century American male actors
American male child actors
American male film actors
American male television actors
Male actors from California
Living people
People from Van Nuys, Los Angeles